The  Gangwal Inter-state bus terminus popularly known as Gangwal Bus Stand or ISBT, located in Indore is one of the oldest and one of the biggest Inter State Bus Terminals in Indore. It operates bus services between Indore (Madhya Pradesh) and 2  other states, Rajasthan, Gujarat.

History
Gangwal Bus Stand was opened in

Services
The bus stand especially offers buses for Western Madhya Pradesh i.e. Dhar, Alirajpur, Jhabua etc. districts and also towards major cities in Gujarat such as Ahmedabad, Vadodara etc.

Facilities
The departure block, waiting area and food court are centrally air conditioned. Reverse Osmosis plants have been installed to supply clean drinking water to the passengers. high speed, secured Wi-Fi zone allows passengers to remain connected. To keep the building environment friendly a sewage treatment plant has been installed with the capacity of 1000 cubic meter per day. The sewage water is treated and recycled to be used in the air-conditioning plant and for the purpose of horticulture and flushing of toilets. A new parking management system has also been developed which is capable of storing data of buses entering and exiting the premises. high resolution CCTV cameras have also been installed for surveillance.

News and Controversies
Many times bus operators organise a strike as a form of protest.

See also
 City portal at Govt. of India info. website

References 

Bus stations in Madhya Pradesh
Year of establishment missing
Transport in Indore